The Karlsruhe Institute of Technology (KIT) is a public research university in Karlsruhe, Germany. The institute is a national research center of the Helmholtz Association.

KIT was created in 2009 when the University of Karlsruhe, founded in 1825 as a public research university and also known as the "Fridericiana", merged with the Karlsruhe Research Center, which had originally been established in 1956 as a national nuclear research center (or KfK).

KIT is a member of the TU9, an incorporated society of the largest and most notable German institutes of technology. As part of the German Universities Excellence Initiative KIT was one of three universities which were awarded excellence status in 2006. In the following "German Excellence Strategy" KIT was awarded as one of eleven "Excellence Universities" in 2019. KIT is among the leading technical universities in Germany and Europe. According to different bibliometric rankings, KIT is the German university with the strongest research in engineering and natural sciences.   
 
In the university part of today's KIT, science-based mechanical engineering was founded in the mid-19th century under the direction of Ferdinand Redtenbacher, which influenced the foundation of other technical universities, such as ETH Zurich in 1855. The university is also among the pioneers of computer science research in Germany. It established the first German faculty for computer science in 1972. On 2 August 1984, the University received the first-ever German e-mail. In the 1990s, all .de domains were registered and managed at the University of Karlsruhe. The same was true for Chinese .cn domains.

KIT alumni and faculty include six Nobel Prize laureates and nine Leibniz Prize winners. The Karlsruhe Institute of Technology is well known for many inventors and entrepreneurs who studied or taught there, including Heinrich Hertz, Karl Friedrich Benz and the founders of SAP SE.

History 

The University of Karlsruhe was founded as a polytechnical school on 7 October 1825. It was modelled on the École polytechnique in Paris. Since 1902 the university has also been known as the Fridericiana in his honour.

The University of Karlsruhe is one of the leading German institutions in computer science. A central computer laboratory was founded in 1966. The department of informatics was established three years later, along with the first regular course in informatics. On 2 August 1984, the university received Germany's first email. The  (Institute of Meteorology and Climate Research) was founded at the university in 1985.

The university also cooperated extensively with the Forschungszentrum Karlsruhe (Karlsruhe Research Centre), and this relationship was formalised on 6 April 2006 when Professor Horst Hippler and Dr. Dieter Ertmann from the University of Karlsruhe, and Professor Manfred Popp and Assistant Jur. Sigurd Lettow from Forschungszentrum Karlsruhe signed a contract for the foundation of the Karlsruhe Institute of Technology (KIT). The name was inspired by the Massachusetts Institute of Technology (MIT), the leading technical university in the United States. In February 2008, the merger of the university and the research centre to form KIT was agreed by the state of Baden-Württemberg and Germany's federal government. The necessary state law was passed on 8 July 2009. KIT was formally established on 1 October 2009.

The main reason for establishing KIT was to strengthen Karlsruhe's position in the German Universities Excellence Initiative, which offered elite universities grants of up to 50 million euros per annum. This aim was not achieved. While the University of Karlsruhe was chosen for the initiative in 2006/2007, KIT failed to secure a place in 2012. It did, however, attract funds from other sources. In 2008, Hans-Werner Hector, co-founder of SAP, raised 200 million euros to support researchers at the institute. (Hector is the only founder of SAP who did not graduate from the University of Karlsruhe; he was given an honorary doctorate for his support of intellectually gifted children in 2003.)

Campus

Campus Nord 

Initial activities focused on Forschungsreaktor 2 (FR2), the first nuclear reactor built by Germany. With the decline of nuclear energy activities in Germany, Kernforschungszentrum Karlsruhe directed its work increasingly towards alternative areas of basic and applied sciences.

Campus Nord is the site of the main German national nuclear engineering research centre and the Institute for Transuranium Elements. Also at the site is a nanotechnology research centre and the neutrino experiment KATRIN.

Campus Nord also hosts a 200-metre-tall guyed mast for meteorological measurements.

Organization and administration

Faculties 
The university has eleven faculties:
 Mathematics
 Physics
 Chemistry and Biology
 Humanities and Social sciences
 Architecture
 Civil engineering, Geology, and Ecological Sciences
 Mechanical Engineering
 Chemical and Process Engineering
 Electrical engineering and Information Technology
 Computer Science
 Economics and Management

Academic profile

Education 

The university offers a great range of education options with such possibilities as cross studies and work-study programs. A studium generale (general studies) program was established in 1949, allowing students to attend lectures not directly pertaining their study field.

In the first semesters of a course, education tends to be theoretically oriented at KIT, with a high concentration on mathematics for engineering and natural science courses. It is possible to choose between practical and theoretical topics in later semesters.

Since the winter semester of 2008/2009, KIT has completed the transition from Diplom degrees to bachelor's degrees and master's degrees. Students already enrolled for a Diplom degree when the transition began were allowed to finish their studies, but new students are allowed to apply only for a bachelor's or master's degree.

Admission policies differ among the departments. While students are chosen by the quality of their school degree and their extracurricular activities for courses such as industrial engineering and management (27% of admissions in 2008), other departments do not preselect for their courses, including physics, informatics, and meteorology. All courses require a minimum number of passed exams, called  or orientation assessments, in the first three semesters before students are allowed to complete their course. There is a substantial drop-out rate in some engineering courses due to the immense study required to meet the prerequisites.

The Zentrum für Angewandte Kulturwissenschaft und Studium Generale (Centre for Applied Culture and General Studies) was founded in 1989 as a central institution to support students engaged in interdisciplinary study. Nowadays, it offers specialised qualifications in the fields of "Leadership and Entrepreneurship", "Media – Culture – Communication", "Internationalisation and Intercultural Decision-making and Responsibility", "Diversity Management", and "European Integration and Identity Studies", as well as the classical studium generale. There is also the possibility of concomitant study in applied culture science.

Research 

In 1979, the Interfakultatives Institut für Anwendungen der Informatik (Interfaculty Institute for Informatics Applications) was founded. It brings together research in physics, mathematics, and engineering based on computer science. Its mathematical pendant is the Institut für Wissenschaftliches Rechnen und Mathematische Modellbildung (Institute for Scientific Calculations and Mathematical Modelling). Its aim is to enhance the exchange between mathematics and engineering in the fields of scientific calculations.

The Interfakultatives Institut für Entrepreneurship (Interfaculty Institute for Entrepreneurship) was established with SAP funding. Its teaching professors were entrepreneurs on their own. Before being shut down in 2010, a former professor of this faculty was Götz Werner, founder of dm-drogerie markt.

In 2001, the Centre for Functional Nanostructures (CFN) was established. It merges the fields within material sciences, biology, chemistry, engineering, and physics which are related to nanotechnology. CFN is one of the three Exzellenzzentren (English: Excellence Institutions) of the University of Karlsruhe. Another interdisciplinary institution is the Centre for Disaster Management and Risk Reduction Technology (CEDIM).

The Karlsruhe School of Optics and Photonics (KSOP) was established in 2006 as a publicly funded project by the Deutsche Forschungsgemeinschaft under the German Universities Excellence Initiative. KSOP was the first graduate school at the University of Karlsruhe and covers the fields of photonic materials and devices, advanced spectroscopy, biomedical photonics, optical systems and solar energy. It is supported by several of the university's institutes and professors. It is also a partner in the EUROPHOTONICS consortium, which provides scholarship for master's and PhD degrees under the European Commission's prestigious Erasmus Mundus cooperation and mobility program.

KIT operates several TCCON stations as part of an international collaborative effort to measure greenhouse gases globally. One station is near the campus.

KIT is partner of the science project for urban and autonomous freight logistics, efeuCampus in Bruchsal, which is funded by the state of Baden-Württemberg and the European Union. At the Institute for Conveying Technology and Logistics Systems (IFL), conveyor systems for intralogistics are being developed for the research project, which are used for mobile robotics and human-machine interaction. The project develops localization and navigation algorithms for an urban environment, which enable vehicles to navigate independently on the basis of laser and video data.

Rankings and reputation 

In the Nature Index (1 August 2019 – 31 July 2020), which measures the scientific strength of different institutions on the basis of publications in 82 high-quality scientific journals, the KIT ranks first in the field of physical sciences  among the universities in Germany, 6th in Europe, and 50th worldwide. Ranks two to five in Germany are followed by TU Munich and LMU Munich, TU Dresden, and University of Erlangen-Nuremberg.

According to a 2015 survey, KIT has produced the largest number of top managers among German universities, with 24 board members of the 100 largest German companies. The other places are followed by the University of Cologne (17), the RWTH Aachen (17), the University of Mannheim (13) and the LMU Munich (13).

In the CWTS Leiden Ranking of the year 2018, which is based exclusively on bibliometrics to measure the research output of universities, KIT is ranked 39th worldwide in the engineering and natural sciences according to the "Impact" indicator and 35th worldwide according to the "Collaboration" indicator. In Germany, KIT is ranked first ahead of RWTH Aachen University (ranked 80th in each case) and TU Munich (ranked 89th and 79th in each case). Europe-wide, KIT is ranked 5th and 7th respectively.

In the 2019 Performance Ranking of Scientific Papers for World Universities released by the National Taiwan University, KIT is ranked 1st in the fields of natural sciences and engineering in Germany.

In the ranking of the German magazine Wirtschaftswoche, in which decision-makers of companies are asked about their preferences, KIT regularly occupies a position among the top 3 in the subjects electrical engineering, computer science, mechanical engineering, and industrial engineering in Germany. Especially in the field of computer science, the top position is often achieved. In the QS Graduate Employability Rankings 2017, which follow a similar approach as the Wirtschaftswoche ranking on a global level, KIT is ranked 20th worldwide. Thus, KIT takes first place in Germany and fifth place in Europe. In the same ranking for 2018, KIT was able to defend its top position in Germany and further extend its lead over other German universities.

In the Webometrics Ranking of World Universities for the year 2020, KIT ranks fourth among 455 listed universities and scientific institutions in Germany.

KIT is a member of the TU9 German Institutes of Technology e.V. As part of the German Universities Excellence Initiative  KIT was awarded an excellence status in 2006 and 2019. In the 2011 performance-ranking of scientific papers, Karlsruhe ranked first in Germany and among the top 10 universities in Europe in engineering and natural sciences.

In the worldwide ranking U-Multirank funded by the European Union, KIT is ranked 57th out of a total of 1610 universities across all categories in 2019. In Germany, KIT reaches the 1st place out of 99 universities examined. The following state universities are LMU Munich, HU Berlin, and TU Munich.

In the Research Ranking of the Association for Information Systems (AIS), KIT is ranked 5th in the Europe / Africa region for the period 2017–2019. KIT is therefore the best university in Germany and the DACH region in terms of research performance in international business informatics. The research performance is quantified by publications in the top journals of the discipline ISR, MISQ, JMIS, and JAIS. Other German universities represented in the top 20 of the list are the University of Mannheim (7th place) and the TU Darmstadt and University of Cologne (both on place 16).

In the 2015 QS World University Rankings the Karlsruhe Institute of Technology achieved 93rd place in the global ranking across all disciplines and 62nd and 34th place in engineering and natural sciences, respectively. In the 2013 Taiwan ranking, KIT (world rank 61) retained its position as the best German University in the engineering and natural sciences, ranking in the engineering sciences ahead of the RWTH Aachen (world rank 89), the Technical University of Munich (world rank 94) and the Technical University of Dresden (world rank 108). For the natural sciences KIT (world rank 51) led the domestic comparison against the LMU Munich (world rank 62), the University of Heidelberg (world rank 72) and the Technical University of Munich (world rank 81). Ranked 26th place in computer science in the Times Higher Education Ranking 2016, KIT is one of the leading universities in computer science in Europe as well as worldwide.

In the Shanghai Ranking by subject, which is also highly regarded internationally, KIT 2017 takes first place among German universities in the fields of "Chemistry", "Chemical Engineering", "Instruments Science & Technology", "Water Resources", and "Transportation Science & Technology" and second place in Germany in the fields of "Biotechnology", "Nanoscience & Nanotechnology", "Materials Science & Engineering", "Energy Science & Engineering", "Environmental Science & Engineering", and "Metallurgical Engineering". A place among the top three German universities is also achieved in the subjects "Mechanical Engineering", "Physics", "Telecommunication Engineering" and "Remote Sensing". In all of these subjects, with the exception of "Environmental Science & Engineering" and "Telecommunication Engineering", KIT is among the 100 best universities in the world, some even among the top 50. In addition, KIT has achieved a top 5 position in Germany in the subjects "Computer Science & Engineering" (4th place), "Electrical & Electronic Engineering", and "Food Science & Technology".
In the 2018 edition of the Shanghai Ranking, KIT was ranked among the best 100 universities in the world in 13 subjects. The three subjects Atmospheric Science (16th place), Metallurgical Engineering (25th place), and Energy Science & Engineering (28th place) even achieved a place among the world's top 30 universities. In 2018, KIT improved, among other things, from 4th to 2nd place in the field of computer science, from 2nd to 1st place in the field of energy science & engineering, and from 5th to 4th place in the field of electrical & electronic engineering throughout Germany. In the 2019 edition of the Shanghai Ranking, KIT achieved and maintained its top position in the field of computer science. In the 2019 edition of the Shanghai Ranking, the KIT was ranked 8th worldwide in atmospheric research, making it one of the leading institutions in this field of research worldwide, ahead of renowned universities such as the Columbia University University (9th place), the Princeton University (17th place) and the Massachusetts Institute of Technology (20th place), the universities in University of Oxford (29th place) and University of Cambridge (place 32) or the Stanford University (place 47). In the Shanghai Ranking 2019, KIT was able to achieve further first places in Germany in the subjects energy sciences, computer science, material sciences, nanotechnology, and transport sciences.

In the University Ranking by Academic Performance (URAP) 2017/2018, KIT is ranked first in Germany in the subjects "Chemical Sciences" (world rank: 49), "Technology" (world rank: 54), "Nanoscience & Nanomaterials" (world rank: 58), "Materials Engineering" (world rank: 48), Chemical Engineering (ranked 43), Mechanical Engineering (ranked 58), Civil Engineering (ranked 76), Environmental Engineering (ranked 98), Meteorology & Atmospheric Sciences (ranked 15) and Transportation Science & Technology (ranked 123) Further top rankings are also achieved in "Physical Sciences" (rank Germany: 3; world rank: 55); "Mathematical Sciences" (rank Germany: 2; world rank: 66); "Engineering" (rank Germany: 3 (after rank 1 last year); world rank 107); "Electrical & Electronics Engineering" (rank Germany: 2; world rank: 70), "Information & Computing Sciences" (rank Germany: 2; world rank: 63), "Earth Sciences" (rank Germany: 2; world rank: 54), "Geology" (rank Germany: 5; world rank: 111), "Metallurgy Engineering" (rank Germany: 2; world rank: 34) and "Architecture" (rank Germany: 2; world rank: 71).

According to the Ranking of Scientific Impact of Leading European Research Universities, an official document compiled by the European Commission, in 2004 Karlsruhe ranks second nationally and sixth in Europe in terms of scholarly impact.

With the exception of the department of biology, in 2003 the university received more funding from the Deutsche Forschungsgemeinschaft than any other university specializing in the natural sciences in Germany. In the engineering sciences (computer science, electrical and mechanical engineering), the university is in the top three together with the University of Stuttgart and RWTH Aachen.

In 2005, more than 20% of its students come from other nations and 0.6% of its students receive grants from the German Studienstiftung (German National Academic Foundation).

Computer facilities 

The Steinbuch Centre for Computing (SCC), named after Karl Steinbuch, was formed in 2008 when the main computer facilities of the University of Karlsruhe merged with those at Forschungszentrum Karlsruhe. It is responsible for the university's IP connectivity and provides central services (Mail, Web, campus management) for students and employees. It supplies students with 10 fully equipped computer rooms, one professional print office and a wireless network providing access to the whole campus area. Some departments, like computer science, physics, and mathematics, run their own computer facilities as well.

The SCC operates some of the fastest computers in Germany:

 HP XC3000 (334 nodes with 8 cores each, 27.04 TFLOPS)
 HP XC4000 (750 nodes with 4 cores each, 15.77 TFLOPS)
 a cluster purchased by a corporation of institutes representing different disciplines (200 nodes with 8 cores each, 17.57 TFLOPS)
 the two vector parallel calculators NEC SX-8R and NEC SX-9

On 2 August 1984, Michael Rotert, a research fellow at University of Karlsruhe, received the first email ever sent to Germany, at his address rotert%germany@csnet-relay.csnet.

GridKa runs the Rocks Cluster Distribution Linux distribution for supercomputers.

Libraries 
The KIT Library with its two branches on Campus South and Campus North provides literature for research and study for about 25,000 students and 8000 scientists with a widespread, interdisciplinary book stock of over 2 million volumes, reports and 28,000 periodicals in print and electronic form. The emphasis of the collection lies in natural and engineering sciences.

 KIT Library South
The 24-hour library at Campus South was extended in 2006. It offers many workplaces and an area for relaxing, and is now open around the clock. The combination of a special book security system and an automated issue desk makes it possible to use the 1000 workplaces anytime, day or night. Current and contemporary literature is freely accessible in four specialised reading rooms, each providing cross-linked, modern and well-equipped study and work stations as well as printers, scanners and copy machines.

 KIT Library North
The research library at Campus North provides a large specialised book stock (especially reports and primary reports) on energy and nuclear energy. All literature is freely accessible to the user. Thirty modern workplaces, as well as printers, scanners, copy machines and cubicles for individual work are available.

 Further libraries at KIT
Additional literature is located in two specialised reading rooms for chemistry and physics, as well as in the Library of the University of Applied Sciences at the Campus at Moltkestrasse, which is administrated by the KIT Library. The faculty of physics, the faculty of mathematics, the faculty of computer science, the faculty of architecture and the faculty of economics and management have their own libraries to supply students and researchers with topic-related literature.

Notable people

Professors 

 Karl Ferdinand Braun (1850–1918), who developed the cathode ray tube in 1897, which is widely used in televisions; in 1909 he received the Nobel Prize for the invention
 Wolfgang Gaede (1878–1945), who founded vacuum technology
 Franz Grashof (1826–1893), who significantly contributed to the understanding of free convection; the Grashof Number was named after him
 Fritz Haber (1868–1934), who developed the high-pressure synthesis of ammonia in 1909 and won a Nobel Prize in Chemistry in 1918
 Heinrich Hertz (1857–1894) discovered electromagnetic waves in 1887, which are the basis for radio transmission, and after whom the SI unit of frequency, hertz is named
 Karl Heun (1859–1929), who is known for his work on numerical integration and solutions to differential equations. He discovered the Heun method.
 Otto Lehmann (1855–1922), the founder of liquid crystal research
 Wilhelm Nusselt (1882–1957), the co-founder of technical thermodynamics
 Ferdinand Redtenbacher (1809–1863), founder of science-based mechanical engineering in Germany
 Roland Scholl (1865–1945), discovered coronene and contributed significantly to the field of organic chemistry in general
 Hermann Staudinger (1881–1965), who won the Nobel Prize in Chemistry in 1953 for his discoveries in the field of macromolecular chemistry
 Karl Steinbuch (1917–2005), a pioneer of computer science in Germany who coined the German term for the field, Informatik, and made early contributions to machine learning and artificial neural networks
 Julius Wess (1934–2007), who co-invented the Wess–Zumino model, the Wess–Zumino–Witten model, the Wess–Zumino consistency condition, and the Thirring–Wess model, in the fields of supersymmetry, quantum field theory and conformal field theory
Ulrich Lemmer (born 1964), a pioneer of organic semiconductors in Germany

Alumni 

 Johann Jakob Balmer (1825–1898), Swiss mathematician and mathematical physicist
 Karl Benz (1844–1929), the inventor of the automobile, a graduate who also received an honorary doctorate in 1914
 Martin Brudermüller (born 1961), German businessman, CEO of BASF
 Franz Fehrenbach (born 1949), chairman of Robert Bosch GmbH
 Robert Gerwig (1820–1885), civil engineer responsible for the Black Forest Railway, the Gotthard Railway, and the Höllental Railway
 Hans Kollhoff (born 1946), Postmodernist and New Classical architect
 Ludwig Levy (1854–1907), Historicist architect
 Sergey Padyukov (1922–1993), architect
 Wilhelm Steinkopf (1879–1949), University of Karlsruhe alumni and professor, co-developer of a method for the mass production of mustard gas during World War I
 Edward Teller (1908–2003), who is known as the originator of the hydrogen bomb
 Roland Mack (born 1949), co-founder of Europa-Park, one of the most popular theme parks in Europe
 Oswald Mathias Ungers (1926–2007), rationalist architect
 Fritz Noether (1884–1941), mathematician and brother of Emmy Noether
 Hasso Plattner (born 1944), Dietmar Hopp (born 1940), Klaus Tschira (1940–2015), three of five co-founders of SAP
 Stefan Quandt (born 1966), businessman and major BMW shareholder
 Franz Reuleaux (1829–1905), a pioneer of kinematics and rector of the Berlin University of Technology
 Leopoldo Rother (1894–1978), architect who designed the campus of National University of Colombia in Bogotá
 Leopold Ružička (1887–1976), winner of the 1939 Nobel Prize in Chemistry
 Peter Sanders (born 1967), computer scientist who won the Leibniz Prize in 2012
 Amin Shokrollahi (born 1964), Iranian mathematician
 Emil Škoda (1839–1900), the founder of the industrial conglomerate Škoda Works
 Albert Speer (1905–1981), Adolf Hitler's chief architect
 Carsten Spohr (born 1966), CEO of Lufthansa
 Boudjemaa Talai (1952–2022), Algerian politician
 August Thyssen (1842–1926), industrialist who founded the steel producer Thyssen AG, a predecessor of ThyssenKrupp, and co-founded RWE, one of the largest German electric utilities companies today
 Ivan Vasilyov (1893–1979), architect of the Bulgarian National Bank headquarters and the Ministry of Defence
 Herbert Wetterauer (born 1957), painter, sculptor, and author
 Rolf Wideröe (1902–1996), Norwegian accelerator physicist
 Dieter Zetsche (born 1953), chairman of Daimler AG and head of Mercedes-Benz Cars
 Dhruv Rathee ( born 1994 ), Indian YouTuber
 Joachim Nagel (born 1966), economist and President of the Deutsche Bundesbank
 Alexander Gerst (born 1976), German European Space Agency astronaut

Other 

 Georg von Hevesy (1886–1966), winner of the 1943 Nobel Prize for his key role in the development of radioactive tracers to study chemical processes such as in the metabolism of animals, worked with Fritz Haber at University of Karlsruhe without formal appointment

Rectors 

 1968 – 1983 Heinz Draheim
 1983 – 1994 Heinz Kunle
 1994 – 2002 Sigmar Wittig
 2002 – 2009 Horst Hippler
 2009–2012: Horst Hippler and  Eberhard Umbach
 2012–2013: Eberhard Umbach
 since 1 October 2013: Holger Hanselka

Points of interest 
 Botanischer Garten der Universität Karlsruhe, the university's botanical garden

Notes and references

External links 
 Official website of the Karlsruhe Institute of Technology

 
Universities and colleges in Karlsruhe
Multidisciplinary research institutes
Educational institutions established in 1825
Educational institutions established in 2009
Architecture schools in Germany
2009 establishments in Germany
Creative Commons books publishing companies
Universities and colleges formed by merger in Germany